Carroll & Graf Publishers was an American publishing company based in New York City, New York, known for publishing a wide range of fiction and non-fiction by both new and established authors, as well as issuing reprints of previously hard-to-find works. It was closed in 2007.

History
Publisher Kent Carroll, the editorial director of Grove Press from 1975 to 1981, co-founded Carroll & Graf in 1982 with Herman Graf, who was Executive Vice President of Grove Press. Headquartered on West 17th Street in New York City, it offered a variety of fiction and non-fiction, including history, biography, current affairs, mysteries (including British imports) and science fiction.

By 1995 Carroll & Graf was releasing 125 titles of fiction and non-fiction annually, by authors ranging from Anthony Burgess, Beryl Bainbridge,  and Penelope Fitzgerald to Philip K. Dick and Eric Ambler. Best Evidence, which spent three months on the NY Times best seller list (Jan - March, 1981), was published by Carroll and Graf, in trade paperback format in 1988.  A non-fiction best-seller, Crossfire: The Plot That Killed Kennedy, was transformed by Oliver Stone into the movie JFK.

Carroll & Graf was purchased by the Avalon Publishing Group in 1998, and in 2003 Will Balliett became its publisher. Avalon was purchased by the Perseus Books Group in January 2007. That May, Perseus president David Steinberger announced that Carroll & Graf would be shut down.

Authors and editors
Notable authors included:

 Brian Aldiss
 Eric Ambler
 Diana Athill
 J.G. Ballard
 Sybille Bedford
 David Benioff
 Georges Bernanos
 Lesley Blanch
 Anthony Burgess 
 Apsley Cherry-Garrard 
 Lady Diana Cooper
 Philip K. Dick
 J. G. Farrell
 Penelope Fitzgerald
 George MacDonald Fraser
 Mavis Gallant
 Jane Gardam
 Erle Stanley Gardner
 Michael Gilbert
 Knut Hamsun 
 Dorothy B. Hughes
 Henry James 
 Thomas Ligotti
 Norman Mailer
 Jim Marrs
 Joseph McElroy
 Henry Miller
 John O'Hara
 James Sallis
 Michael Shaara 
 Gilbert Sorrentino 
 Jared Taylor
 Peter Taylor
 D.M. Thomas
 Auberon Waugh

Carroll & Graf editor-in-chief Philip Turner departed in 2006 and was replaced by Bill Strachan, who began a career in the business 35 years earlier as an Anchor Books editorial secretary, rising through the ranks at Viking Press, Houghton Mifflin and Henry Holt to Columbia University Press.

References

External links
 Books published by Carroll & Graf

1982 establishments in New York City
2007 disestablishments in New York (state)
Book publishing companies based in New York City
Companies based in Manhattan
Defunct book publishing companies of the United States
Publishing companies established in 1982
Publishing companies disestablished in 2007